Simona Halep was the defending champion, but she chose not to participate this year.

Anastasia Pavlyuchenkova won the title, defeating Irina-Camelia Begu in the final, 6–4, 5–7, 6–1.

Seeds
The first four seeds received a bye into the second round.

Draw

Finals

Top half

Bottom half

Qualifying

Seeds

Qualifiers

Qualifying draw

First qualifier

Second qualifier

Third qualifier

Fourth qualifier

References
 Main draw
 Qualifying draw

Kremlin Cup - Singles
2014 Women's Singles